Nyong-et-Kéllé is a department of Centre Province in Cameroon.
The department covers an area of 6,362 km and as of 2001 had a total population of 145,181. The capital of the department lies at Éséka.

Subdivisions
The department is divided administratively into 10 communes and in turn into villages.

Communes 

 Biyouha
 Bondjock
 Bot-Makak
 Dibang
 Eséka
 Makak
 Matomb
 Messondo 
 Ngog-Mapubi 
 Ngui-Bassal

References

Departments of Cameroon
Centre Region (Cameroon)